Italy, as a single nation state, began only in 1861, after the Piedmont-based Kingdom of Sardinia conquered most of present-day Italy.  At that point, titles were recognized to all who held them according to the law of so-called pre-unitarian States.  Consequently, the Kingdom of Italy had several different nobility traditions, one for each pre-unitarian State and one for the unified state (that was actually the Piedmontese-Savoyard one).  That is why the Italian College of Arms, called Consulta araldica (heraldic council), was organized in 14 "regional" commissions.  Common rules concerning all titles were established only in 1926. That is why a list of Italian marquisates has to be divided into different pre-unitarian lists, plus a unified list for titles granted after 1861. The latter should be completed with titles granted by the last King of Italy, Humbert II, during his exile and after the proclamation of the republic (1946), until his death in 1983: these concessions base upon the fact that he was not defeated in war and thus remained a king, that is a fons honorum, but this issue is controversial, titles granted by a non-reigning king not being recognized by most noble and royal families in Europe.  Only the Sovereign Military Order of Malta and the Corpo della Nobiltà Italiana recognize these titles, while the CILANE treats them as mere titles of courtesy.
Since 1948, the republican constitution states that nobility titles are not recognized. It means that public bodies have not the power to use them towards nobility and tribunals have no power to state about their existence or non-existence, even as an interlocutory matter. The main association that privately protects titles and nobility is the Corpo della Nobiltà Italiana (body of the Italian nobility, also known as CNI).

List of marquesses in the Papal States 

In Rome, several families hold a title of Marquis. A couple of them (traditionally four) are called "Marquesses of canopy" (in Italian: marchesi di "baldacchino"), since they hold the privilege of being among those that the Pope could visit and kept in their residence a special throne under a canopy for this aim. It is a historical privilege (the Pope does not visit privates nowadays) that permits these families to rank among Roman Princes and Dukes and let their members – as it happens for all families of Princes and Dukes in Italy – to be styled as Don or Donna before their first name. Since it is a customary privilege, some of them are disputed, especially in cases when a family became extinct and it is not clear whether another family has inherited the dignity.

Canopy marquesses 
 House of Patrizi (Patrizi Naro Montoro), beforehand Naro: the Marquess of Mompeo;
 House of Theodoli, beforehand Astalli: the Marquess of Saint Vitus and Pisoniano;
 House of Costaguti: the Marquess of Sipicciano; this house became extinct in 1921 with the marriage of the last Marquess Costaguti's only child, a daughter, with Marquess Afan de Rivera, whose descent have added the surname Costaguti: it is disputed weather Marquess Afan de Rivera Costaguti is actually a Canopy Marquess;
 House of Cavalieri: the Marquess of Penna; this house became extinct in 1814: it is disputed if the house Capranica had succeeded to the Cavalieri as Canopy Marquesses;
 Count Gerolamo Riccini: the Marquess of Vallepietra, title granted in 1842 explicitly together with honours of canopy but rapidly extinct;
 House of Serlupi (Serlupi Crescenzi), beforehand Crescenzi: Marquess;
 House of Sacchetti: Marquess of Castelromano (Letters patent 1933)

Other marquesses in Rome 
Other marquesses include some distinguished families and also many of the Roman princes, who have among their many titles some of Marquess. The latter are non-included in the list hereafter; on the other hand, the list is incomplete also as concerns houses whose main title is that of Marquess.
 ltoviti-Avila Niccolai Lazzerini: Marquess;
 Cappelletti di Santa Maria del Ponte: Marquess;
 Cavalletti De Rossi, Patricians of Rome: the Marquess of Oliveto Sabino;
 Lepri: Marquess, the Marquess of Rota;
 Mazzetti: the Marquess of Pietralata, Patricians of Rome;
 Pellegrini Quarantotti: the Marquess of Casciolino.

List of marquesses in the rest of Latium, in Umbria and in the Marches 
The list is incomplete.
 House del Gallo, Noble of Rieti: the Marquess of Roccagiovine.
Marchesi Del Monte

List of marquesses in the papal "Romagne" 
The list is incomplete.
 Hercolani (Princes of the Holy Roman Empire, Patrician of Bologna): the Marquess of Blumberg;
 Malvezzi, Patrician of Bologna (1st line, Malvezzi Campeggi): the Marquess of Dozza
 Malvezzi, Patrician of Bologna (2nd line, Malvezzi de' Medici): the Marquess of Castelguelfo;

List of marquesses in Piedmont 
Present Piedmont was called the principality of Piedmont and in its territory lie the former sovereign Marquisates of Montferrat (later Dukedom) and Saluzzo. Since it has been ruled by the Duke of Savoy whose sovereign title was that of Duke, the title of Marquis is quite rare and reveals a relevant rank. Hereafter some of the houses holding a title of marquis are listed, in alphabetical order, and the relevant title is indicated with the form of succession. The list is incomplete.
 Asinari: the Marquess of San Marzano (the eldest male);
 Birago de Candia e Borgaro: since 1680, Marquess of Candia (all males).
 del Carretto (Lords of Ponti and Sessame): Marquess (all males);
 Cordero (known as Montezemolo): the Marquess of Montezemolo (the eldest male);
 Guasco (Princes): Marquess of Bisio and Francavilla (all males);
 Manfredi (known as d'Androgna): the Marquess of Angrogna (all males); 
 Incisa (both lines d'Incisa di Camerana and d'Incisa della Rocchetta): Marquess (all males);
 Medici del Vascello: Marquess (the eldest male);
 Mori Ubaldini degli Alberti: the Marquess of Marmora (the eldest male);
 Ripa: the Marquess of Giaglione (the eldest male), Marquess of Meana (all males);
 Taparelli (known as d'Azeglio): the Marquess of Azeglio (the eldest male);
 Thaon (Counts of Revel; known as Thaon di Revel): Marquess (the eldest male);

List of marquesses in Sardinia 
The following section contains the list of all Marquessates that have been existing or have existed in the Kingdom of Sardinia.  Titles were created through letters patent by the King of Sardinia, who was also King of Aragon since 1326 (actual creation of the Kingdom of Sardinia) to 1500, King of Spain and of Aragon since 1500 to 1713, Emperor of the Holy Roman Empire since 1519 to 1556 and since 1713 to 1720 and Duke of Savoy since 1720 to 1847.  The autonomous Kingdom of Sardinia ceased in 1847, when its Parliament asked the King – and obtained – for the unification (Italian: perfetta fusione) with the other States belonging to him, namely the Dukedom of Savoy, the Principality of Piedmont, the County of Nice and the Dukedom of Genoa.  Titles granted after 1847 by the kings of Sardinia, who became also Kings of Italy since 1861, are not listed here.
Feudalism ceased in the years 1838–1840, when fiefs were redeemed by the Crown, i.e. bought.  Afterwards, titles continued to be recognized as honours, and nothing changed to this regard after the unification of Italy.  Since the establishment of the Italian Republic in 1946, titles are not officially recognized anymore and they exist as traditional and historical remains.  The main associations that privately protect titles and nobility are the Corpo della Nobiltà Italiana (body of the Italian nobility, also known as CNI) and the Corpo della Nobiltà Sarda (body of the Sardinian nobility).

In 14th and 15th centuries, no titles were granted, but only fief possession.  Lords of fiefs were called (in Catalan) Barons or Señors, i.e. lords (normally – but not always – the distinction depended on the extent of the power granted with the fief: Barons had the merum and mixtum imperium, meaning civil and criminal jurisdiction, while Lords only the mixtum imperium, civil jurisdiction) without these terms referring to specific titles but indicating just their quality of fief owners.  Progressively, as a mark of distinction, a couple of titles of Viscount were granted: the Kings of Aragon were primarily Counts of Barcelona, so the usual title they had granted in Catalonia had been the one below their own rank.  Chiefly in the 16th century, most important feudal lords began to receive titles of Counts, in order to emphasize their role.  Only since the end of the century titles of Marquess (Marquis) were granted, as a result of an inflation of titles.  Titles of Dukes were as rare as only one was granted before the Savoy rule.  A few exception to this trend have to be regarded as recognition of quasi-sovereign status: the rulers of Arborea had in different times the titles of Judex Arboreae, Count of Goceano, Count of Monteleone and Marquis of Oristano, while the foremost house of Carroz, admirals and viceroys, had the title of Count of Quirra.

Since the rank of marquis was theoretically the highest one, marquesses were addressed as "illustrious" by anyone and as "cousin" by the monarch, a concept similar to peerage.

Titles were granted either according to the Italian or the Catalan tradition (Latin respectively iuxta morem Italiae and iuxta morem Cathaluniae), meaning that the succession was only by male primogeniture or also by females if the holder of the title had no sons. Succession by females was abolished in 1926, meaning that if the holder has no sons, the title passes to his younger brother, if any (as the normal succession for British titles today).

Note on language. The ordinary use in Sardinia is that proper names be translated according to the language of the document: that is why name of titles has been translated to English if the case be. For name of people, we adopted the actual most used language at the time: Catalan until the 16th century included, Spanish for the 17th and 18th centuries and later for Spanish subjects, and Italian for the 19th century for Sardinian subjects.

List of marquesses in Lombardy 
Lombardy has probably been Italian land with most encountering of Nobility traditions. Consequently, Lombard Nobility has all Italian ranks, including Patricians of the most important cities. Just a few main existing houses being styled as Marquesses are listed hereafter in alphabetical order, indicating the house main title if other and – the case be – the city that houses are Patricians of. The list is most incomplete.
Borromeo (Borromeo Arese, 1st line, Princes of Angera): Marquess of Angera, Patrician of Milan;
 Borromeo (Borromeo d'Adda, 2nd line): Marquess of Pandino, Patrician of Milan;
 Brivio (Brivio Sforza): Marquess of Santa Maria in Prato, Marquess, Patrician of Milan;
 Casati (Casati Stampa): Marquess of Casatenovo, Patrician of Milan;
 Gallarati Scotti (Princes of Molfetta): Marquess of Cerano, Patrician of Milan;
Stampa: Marquess of Soncino, Count of the Holy Roman Empire, Patrician of Milan;
 Terzi (Lords of Sant'Agata): Marquess, Noble of Bergamo;
Visconti di Modrone (Dukes): Marquess of Vimodrone, Patrician of Milan.

List of marquesses in Liguria 
Genoa was ruled as an aristocrat republic until the Napoleonic age, extending its dominion to the whole Liguria and some areas of present Piedmont; after the restoration it became part of the Piedmont-led Kingdom of Sardinia.  As all Nobles could be elected to a government office, all were in principle equal; they had the title of Patrician of Genoa, indicated by p.g. after the name and surname, while members of noble families outside the capital had the title of Nobleman or Noblewoman.  No other title was specific of the Republic, but several families got titles from other rulers.
After the fall of the republic, a consideration arouse: since the head of the State was the Doge, i.e. a Duke, Patrician of Genoa had to be considered as just below, i.e. Marquesses: consequently several head of families pledged for such an acknowledgment by the Consulta araldica and the Corpo della Nobiltà Italiana and are styled as Marquesses today; this automatic acknowledgment has been questioned at the end of 20th century and is no more realized by the C.N.I., those acknowledgments already done remaining valid.
Houses whose eldest male bear the title of Marquess before his name (incomplete list):
 Balbi;
 Cambiaso;
 Cattaneo Adorno;
 Chiavari;
 Curlo;
 De Ferrari (second and third line);
 Doria (various lines);
 Durazzo;
 Giustiniani;
 Gropallo;
 Imperiale and Imperiali;
 Invrea;
 Lomellini (Lomellini Tabarca);
 Negrotto Cambiaso;
 Pallavicini and Pallavicino;
 Pinelli (Pinelli Gentile).

Other titles:
 Marquess of Pontinvrea: house of Durazzo;
 Marquess of Sforzesca: house of Gropallo.

List of marquesses in the so-called "Venices" 
Venice has been an independent aristocratic republic since the 8th century until 1797.  Since the power was shared among noble houses and every nobleman could be elected (by vote or by ballot) to the most important offices, all noble houses were in principle equal: every member of the aristocracy had the only title of nobiluomo (nobleman) or nobildonna (noblewoman), although some of the Venetian houses are actually the oldest aristocracy in the world, since they can track their ancestors back to the beginning of the Republic.  Venice (usually called the Serenissima Republica) was a naval power and thus the wealth of Venetians did not depend on the land but on trades.  Also other cities and towns in Venice inland, although subject to Venice, were ruled by noble councils, whose members were nobles by the right to participate to council: the Venetian region is the land of civic nobility.  For these reasons, nobility titles other than Nobil Homo/Nobil Donna (usually indicated as N.H. and N.D.), Patrician of Venice (or Venetian Patrician) and Nobleman/Noblewoman of a certain city or town are the only real Venetian titles.
After the fall of the republic, under Habsburgs rule, and since 1866 under Italian rule, many Venetian houses got traditional titles, most of them count, that is usually for all family members or at least for all males and usually with no territorial indication.
The following list of titles of Marquesses is just the list of families living in the Venetian territories who presently bear such a title, without these title being "Venetian" titles. It is an extract of titles recorded by the three Nobility associations whose competence is the former Venetian territory and that are inspired by the regional commissions of the Consulta araldica: the Venetian one for present Italian region Veneto and provinces of Udine and Pordenone of present-day Italian region Friuli-Venezia Giulia (that is proper Friuli), the Trento one for present Italian region Trentino-Alto Adige/Südtirol (although its competence for noble houses from Alto Adige or South Tyrol, that is the German-speaking province of Bolzano, remains doubtful: are they Italian or Austrian nobles?), and the one for Venezia Giulia, Istria e Dalmazia for present provinces of Trieste and Gorizia (Venezia Giulia or Julian March, part of present administrative region of Friuli-Venezia Giulia) and families coming from present Slovenian and Croatian territories of Istria and Dalmatia.  Only flourishing families are recorded and they appear in alphabetical order, the particle "de" not being considered to this aim unless it is written with a capital letter.

Besides of the family titles, two members of the clergy bear, among others, the title of Marquis:
 the bishop of Treviso;
 the bishop of Vicenza.
The use of the Roman Catholic Church is that bishop not use nobility tiles nowadays.

List of marquesses in Parma and Piacenza 
List of all noble houses bearing the title of Marquis nowadays or that are recently extinct, recognized by the Corpo della Nobiltà Italiana. The list is ordered by ancientness of the title.

List of marquesses in Modena and Reggio 
The Duchy of Modena and Reggio was an independent State from 1598 (before it depended upon Ferrara, that was the main see of the ruling family) until the unification of Italy in 1859, under the rule of the Este until the Napoleonic era and after the Restoration, since 1814, under the Habsburg-Este who had inherited it.
The aristocracy of the Duchy includes many families whose members are Patricians of Modena, Patricians of Reggio, Noble of Mirandola, Noble of Carpi, Noble of Finale or Noble of Correggio; several of them, moreover, have the title of Count or Marquis; some had foreign titles.
The list hereunder includes only the titles of flourishing families recognized by the Corpo della Nobiltà Italiana (C.N.I.) listed in alphabetical order: the particle "de" is not considered to this aim unless it is written with a capital letter.

List of marquesses in Tuscany 
In Tuscany during the middle age and early modern era all towns and cities were autonomous States with the form of Republics, each having its own Nobility.  That is why, in the most incomplete list hereafter, for each house not only is indicated the title of Marquess, but also the Patriciate they hold.  Houses are listed by order of creation.

Other families with Tuscan Marquessates include:

 Altoviti de'Medici: Marquess of the Holy Roman Empire, Patrician of Florence;
 Antinori: Marquess, Patrician of Florence;
 Bartolini Salimbeni: Marquess (created by Charles VII, Holy Roman Emperor 22 Mar 1713), Patrician of Florence
 Bichi Ruspoli Forteguerri Pannilini: Marquess, Patrician of Siena;
 del Carretto (del Carretto di Ponti e Sessame): Marquess;
 Mazzarosa Devincenzi Prini Aulla: Marquess (all males), Patrician of Lucca;
 Rosselli Del Turco (1st line): Marquess, Patrician of Florence;
 San Martino (1st line, San Martino d'Agliè): Marquess of Fontanetto with San Germano, Marquess of Rivarolo with Bosconero;

There were also a small number of ecclesiastical Marquessates, including:

 Cesa
 Stale
 Turicchi

List of marquesses in the "Neapolitan provinces" (kingdom of Naples and the continental part of the kingdom of the Two Sicilies) 
The Kingdom of Naples – united, after the Napoleonic age, to the Kingdom of Sicily thus forming an accentrate Kingdom of the Two Sicilies –  was the largest and most demographically and culturally developed of the Italian states. Nobles were many, powerful and with many titles: it was one of the few states that used the title of Prince (Principe) as a title of nobility, being why in the mostly incomplete list below Marquessates are divided according to the house and line to which they belong, identifying the line with its main title. Succession is by primogenitor.
 House d'Aquino, Princes of Caramanico: Marquess of Francolise and Marquess of Castelnuovo;
 House d'Avalos, Princes of Holy Roman Empire: Marquess of Pescara and Marquess of the Vasto;
 House Capece Minutolo, Dukes of San Valentino, second line: Marquess of Bugnano (Capece Minutolo Princes of Canosa also exist);
 House Caracciolo, family Caracciolo-Rossi:
 line of Princes of Avellino: Marquess of Sanseverino;
 line of Princes of Torella: Marquess of Valle Siciliana and Marquess of Monacilioni;
 line of the Princes of Spinoso: Marquess of Laterza and Marquess of Guardia Perticara;
 line of Dukes of Laurino: Marquess of San Marco dei Cavoti;
 House Caracciolo, family Caracciolo-Pisquizi:
 line of Princes of Marano: Marquess of Barisciano;
 line of Princes of Melissano: Marquess of Amorosi and Marquess of Taviano;
 line of Princes of Cellamare: Marquess of Alfedena;
 line of Princes Caracciolo Carafa: Marquess of Santeramo and Marquess of Cervinara;
 House Carafa, line Carafa della Spina Princes of Roccella: Marquess of Brancaleone and Marquess of Castelvetere;
 House Carafa, line Carafa della Stadera Dukes of Andria: Marquess of Corato;
 House Imperiali, Princes of Francavilla: Marquess of Oyra (Grand of Spain) and Marquess of Latiano;
 House de Vargas Machuca, Dukes of Vargas Machuca: Marquess of San Vicente (Grand of Spain) and Marquess of Valtolla;
 House Campolattaro, family dAgistino-Campolattaro: Marquess of Campolattaro. Castello dCampolattaro.
 House Pucci: Marquess of Barsento (created by Philip IV, King of Spain 1664)

List of marquesses in Sicily 
The Kingdom of Sicily was founded in 1282 and ended in 1816 when it was succeeded by the unified Kingdom of Two Sicilies (and since 1859 by the even more unified Kingdom of Italy).  Sicilian Nobility, during these centuries, got much power and many titles, up to that of Prince.  Only a few existing titles of Marquess are listed hereafter, in alphabetical order of the houses bearing them, indicating also the line and their main title. The list is thus mostly incomplete.
 house Alliata (9 titles of Prince): Marquess of Santa Lucia;
 house de Gregorio (Princes of Saint Theodore): Marquess;
 house Lanza (Princes of Trabia): Marquess of Militello, Marquess of Barrafranca, Marquess of the Ginestra (of the Broom), Marquess of Misuraca (Neapolitan title);
 house Paternò (line of Dukes of Roccaromana): Marquess of the Toscano;
 house Paternò (family Paternò Castello, line of San Giuliano): Marquess of San Giuliano;
 house Paternò (family Paternò Ventimiglia, line of Regiovanni): Marquess of Regiovanni;
 house Paternò (line of Dukes of San Nicola): Marquess;
 house Salvo: Marquess of Pietraganzili
 house Stagno (princes of Alcontres): Marquess of Roccalumera and Soreto;
 house Starrabba (Princes of Giardinelli and Militello): Marquess of St. Agatha;
 house Trigona (whose 1st line are Princes of Sant'Elia), 3rd line: Marquess of Canicarao; Marquess of Dainammare.

Notes

References

Sources 

Sardinia
 
 
 
 
 
 

 

Rome
 

Venice
 

Modena and Reggio
Parma and Piacenza
 

Whole Italy, including pre-unitarian States
 

Italy
Italian nobility
Margraves of Italy
Italy marquesses